Frank Campo (born 1927) is an American composer. He is Emeritus Professor of Music at California State University Northridge.

Selected recorded works
Dall'ombra alla luce
Dialogues II, Op. 126
Trio, Op. 87
Variations on a Theme of Paganini

References

External links
Interview with Frank Campo, August 21, 1991

1927 births
Living people
California State University, Northridge faculty